is a former Grand Prix motorcycle road racer. He had his best season riding for the Aprilia factory in 1996, when he won four Grand Prix races and finished second in the 125cc world championship behind Haruchika Aoki. Tokudome won five Grand Prix races during his career. He now races in the MFJ All Japan Road Race J-GP2 Championship, aboard a Speed Up. He was the J-GP3 Champion in the class for the first time in 2012, after being runner up on three separate occasions, and again in 2016.

Career statistics
1992- 1st, Japan GP125 Super Cup #36 Honda RS125R
1993- 3rd, All Japan GP125 Championship #36 Honda RS125R
1994- 8th, 125cc World Championship #36 Honda RS125R
1995- 7th, 125cc World Championship #8 Honda RS125R
1996- 2nd, 125cc World Championship #7 Aprilia RS 125 R
1997- 5th, 125cc World Championship #2 Aprilia RS 125 R
1998- 7th, 125cc World Championship #5 Aprilia RS 125 R
1999- 18th, 250cc World Championship #36 TSR Honda RS125R
2001- 14th, All Japan GP125 Championship #39 Yamaha TZR125
2002- 12th, All Japan GP250 Championship #36 Yamaha TZR250
2003- 4th, All Japan GP250 Championship #12 Yamaha TZR250
2004- 6th, All Japan GP250 Championship #4 Yamaha TZR250
2005- 8th, All Japan GP250 Championship #6 Yamaha TZR250
2006- 11th, All Japan GP125 Championship #36 Honda RS125R
2007- 2nd, All Japan GP125 Championship #11 Honda RS125R
2008- 2nd, All Japan GP125 Championship #2 Honda RS125R
2009- 4th, All Japan GP125 Championship #2 Honda RS125R
2010- 7th, All Japan J-GP3 Championship #4 Honda RS125R
2011- 2nd, All Japan J-GP3 Championship #7 Honda RS125R
2012- 1st, All Japan J-GP3 Championship #634 Honda RS125R
2013- 7th, All Japan J-GP3 Championship #1 Honda NSF250R
2014- 4th, All Japan J-GP3 Championship #7 Honda NSF250R
2015- 6th, All Japan J-GP3 Championship #4 Honda NSF250R
2016- 1st, All Japan J-GP3 Championship #36 Honda NSF250R
2017- 8th, All Japan J-GP2 Championship #36 Speed Up SF
2018- All Japan J-GP2 Championship #36    Speed Up SF

References 

1971 births
Living people
Sportspeople from Kagoshima Prefecture
Japanese motorcycle racers
125cc World Championship riders
250cc World Championship riders